Kalskag Airport  is a public airport located one mile (1.6 km) west of the central business district of Upper Kalskag, a city in the Bethel Census Area of the U.S. state of Alaska. The airport is owned by the state. It is situated on the Kuskokwim River, between the cities of Upper Kalskag and Lower Kalskag.

Facilities 

Airlines and destinations 

Prior to its bankruptcy and cessation of all operations, Ravn Alaska served the airport from multiple locations.

References

External links 
 FAA Alaska airport diagram (GIF)

Airports in the Bethel Census Area, Alaska